Aleix Alcaraz Roig (born 26 June 1990) is a professional racing driver from Spain.

Career

Karting
Prior to the start of his racing career, Alcaraz enjoyed a long and illustrious karting career which began in the year 2000, when he won the Spanish District Championship Catalonia title. He followed that up a year later with victory in the Copa Campeones Trophy Cadet class. He raced primarily in his homeland until 2004, when he began to take part in various European karting championships such as the European Championship ICA Junior, Andrea Margutti Trophy ICA Junior and Italian Open Masters ICA Junior categories.

2005 saw Alcaraz claim the Spanish Championship ICA Junior title, beating countryman Roberto Merhi by four points, and finish third in the Andrea Margutti Trophy ICA Junior class, behind Merhi and Charles Pic. His final year of karting in 2006 saw Alcaraz claim fifth place in the World Cup ICA class.

Formula Three
In October 2006, Alcaraz stepped up to single-seaters, racing in the penultimate round of the Spanish Formula Three Championship season in Jerez, where he finished the two races in 16th and 15th places respectively.

Formula Renault 2.0
Later the same month, Alcaraz made his Formula Renault début at the final round of the Eurocup Formula Renault 2.0 season in Barcelona, finishing the two events in 24th and 23rd place respectively. In November 2006, he took part in the Italian Formula Renault 2.0 Winter Series for Cram Competition, finishing in 7th place with teammate and former Formula One driver Jaime Alguersuari winning all four races and the title.

In 2007, Alcaraz contested both the Eurocup Formula Renault 2.0 and Italian Formula Renault 2.0 series with the Petrom District Racing AP team, alongside Mihai Marinescu. In the Eurocup he finished in 19th place after two points finishes, whilst in the Italian championship he finished in the points on eight occasions to be classified in 17th place, despite missing the final round of the series at Monza.

Formula Renault 3.5 Series
In November 2007, Alcaraz sampled a Formula Renault 3.5 Series car for the first time, driving for Pons Racing at the opening winter test at Paul Ricard. Although he conducted the majority of his winter testing with the team, he was signed by Italian team RC Motorsport to contest the 2008 season. Despite an encouraging start to the season, when he finished in the points in only his second race, he left the team after the fourth round of the year at Silverstone and was subsequently replaced by Brazilian Claudio Cantelli.

Alcaraz did, however, return to the series at the following round of the season in Hungary, taking the seat of Máximo Cortés at Pons Racing, who had run into sponsorship problems. In his ten races for the team, he took a single points finish in the sprint race at Le Mans to eventually be classified 27th in the final standings.

Racing record

Career summary

† - As Alcaraz was a guest driver, he was ineligible to score points.

Complete Formula Renault 3.5 Series results
(key) (Races in bold indicate pole position) (Races in italics indicate fastest lap)

Notes

References

External links
 

1990 births
Living people
Sportspeople from Terrassa
Spanish racing drivers
Catalan racing drivers
Euroformula Open Championship drivers
Formula Renault Eurocup drivers
Italian Formula Renault 2.0 drivers
World Series Formula V8 3.5 drivers
Pons Racing drivers
Cram Competition drivers
RC Motorsport drivers